The Lone Star was a passenger train operated by St. Louis Southwestern Railway (Cotton Belt) between Memphis, and Dallas, with through connections via Cotton Belt parent, Southern Pacific, for San Antonio, El Paso, and ultimately Los Angeles.  There were also through cars operating between Memphis, Lewisville and Shreveport.  At various times during the train's operation, connecting services were also provided from Brinkley to St. Louis.  The train was discontinued on November 1, 1952, as a part of extensive passenger train restructuring by St. Louis Southwestern. The Lone Star was replaced by trains number 107 and 108 which connected with the Cotton Belt mainline at Mount Pleasant, Texas.

References

 
 

Lone Star
Named passenger trains of the United States
Night trains of the United States
Railway services introduced in 1928
Railway services discontinued in 1952
Passenger rail transportation in Tennessee
Passenger rail transportation in Arkansas
Passenger rail transportation in Missouri
Passenger rail transportation in Texas